Michael Chugani is a Hong Kong journalist. He was born in Hong Kong and had his childhood there.

He wrote columns for the South China Morning Post (SCMP) and the Hong Kong Economic Journal (HKEJ), and he hosted News Watch English and Straight Talk on TVB. In April 2021 he resigned from all of those programmes.

His elder brother Mohan Chugani is currently vice president and previously the president of the India Association Hong Kong. Mohan was involved in the water cannon incident at Kowloon Mosque during the protests in 2019.

References

Further reading

External links
 Index of articles by Chugani from the South China Morning Post
 Index of articles by Chugani from the Hong Kong Economic Journal

Hong Kong journalists
Living people
Year of birth missing (living people)